Dibharna is a market center in Sandhikharka Municipality of Arghakhanchi District in the Lumbini Zone of Western Nepal. The former village development committee (VDC) was converted into a municipality on 18 May 2014 by merging the existing Sandhikharka, Bangla, Narapani, Khanchikot, Keemadada, Argha and Dibharna VDCs. At the time of the 1991 Nepal census, the town had a population of 4,490 living in 841 houses. At the time of the 2001 Nepal census, the population was 6,990, of which 56% was literate.

References

Populated places in Arghakhanchi District